The lac Kénogamichiche is a freshwater body of the watershed of the La Belle Rivière and lac Saint-Jean, in the municipality of Hébertville, in the Lac-Saint-Jean-Est Regional County Municipality, in the administrative region of Saguenay–Lac-Saint-Jean, in the province of Quebec, in Canada.

The area around the lake is served by the route 169 which passes to the west and by the rang Saint-Isidore road (north shore), for the needs of recreational tourism activities, especially the resort.

Recreational and tourist activities, especially vacationing, are the main economic activities in this area; agriculture and forestry, second.

The surface of Lake Kénogamichiche is usually frozen from the beginning of December to the end of March, however the safe circulation on the ice is generally made from mid-December to mid-March.

Geography 
The main watersheds near Lake Kénogamichiche are:
 north side: Rivière des Aulnaies, Petite rivière Bédard, Rivière Bédard, Raquette River, La Petite Décharge;
 east side: Kenogami Lake, Pikauba River, Chicoutimi River, Bras des Angers, Rivière aux Sables, Cascouia River;
 south side: Vert Lake, La Belle Rivière, ruisseau L'Abbé, lac de la Belle Rivière, rivière du Milieu, Métabetchouane River;
 west side: Belle Rivière, Métabetchouane River, ruisseau de la Belle Rivière, Grignon River, Ouiatchouan River, lac Saint-Jean.

This lake is mainly fed by riparian streams, by the outlet (coming from the south) of Vert Lake and by the stream of the Floating Bridge (coming from the northeast). The mouth of this lake is located to the northeast, at:
  south-east of the confluence of the Rivière des Aulnaies;
  north-east of route 169;
  west of Kenogami Lake;
  south-east of the village center of Hébertville;
  east of lac Saint-Jean;
  south-east of the mouth of the La Belle Rivière;
  south of downtown Alma.

Toponymy 
This body of water is located in the hollow of a kettle formed following global warming 10,500 years ago, which followed a glaciation whose cover was about three kilometers thick. Located in the municipality of Hébertville, it is located on the old waterway that once connected the Saguenay to Lake Saint-Jean via Lake Kénogami. A  plateau, where the Beau Portage lake is located, allows communication between these two lakes.

This toponym appears in the form Kinougamichis in the Jesuit Relations of 1672 under the pen of Father Albanel. This name turns out to be a diminutive of kenogami, meaning "small long lake". It was once famous for the multitude of long-tailed frogs that inhabited it and made a continuous croaking. In addition, various spellings have been inventoried for this toponym, including Kinogamichiche, Kinougamisis, Tshnuagamitshish, etc.

The toponym "lac Kénogamichiche" was formalized on September 5, 1968, by the Commission de toponymie du Québec.

Notes and references

Appendices

Related articles 
 Lac-Saint-Jean-Est Regional County Municipality
 Hébertville, a municipality
 Saguenay River
 Lac Saint-Jean
 La Belle Rivière
 Rivière des Aulnaies
 Lac Vert
 List of lakes in Canada

Lakes of Saguenay–Lac-Saint-Jean
Lac-Saint-Jean-Est Regional County Municipality